Sifan  is a village in Anantnag tehsil in Anantnag district in Jammu and Kashmir, India.

Demographics
According to Census 2011 information, the location code or village code of Sifan village is 003662. Sifan village is located in Anantnag tehsil of Anantnag district in Jammu and Kashmir, India.

Sifan has a total population of 1,438 peoples. There are about 205 houses in Sifan village.

Transport

By Rail
Sadura Railway Station and Anantnag Railway Station are the very near by railway stations to Sifan. However Jammu Tawi railway station is major railway station   near to Sifan.

References

Villages in Anantnag district